Railway guns were large guns and howitzers mounted on and fired from specially constructed railway cars. They have been obsolete since World War II and have been superseded by tactical surface-to-surface missiles, multiple rocket launchers, and bomber aircraft.

Notes and references

List
Railway